Happiness Is Coming is an 2018 Chinese comedy film produced by Huang Jianxin and co-directed and co-written by Feng Gong. The film stars Feng Gong, Tu Songyan and Niu Li. The film was slated for release on June 8, 2018 in China.

Cast
 Feng Gong as Ma Shanglai
 Niu Li as Ma Shanglai's wife
 Tu Songyan as Mao Xuewang
 Jia Ling
 Mao Junjie as Jin Zhen
 Bai Kainan as the disciple of Ma Shanglai
 Zhang Xiaofei as Lu Lu
 Yue Yunpeng
 Turbo Liu as Ma Xiao, Ma's son.
 Song Ning
 Xia Fan
 Jiang Hongbo as Sun Erxiang
 Liang Chao

Production
Happiness Is Coming is Feng Gong's third film, ten years later after Eat Hot Tofu Slowly (2005) and A Big Potato (2007).

In order to deduce the real response of the character in critical circumstances, Feng Gong, who is 60 years old, still persists in not having to be a substitute, whether in a high altitude of dozens of meters rising and falling, or in a thrilling hopping fight. The audiences mistook him for Jackie Chan.

This film was shot entirely in southwest China's Chongqing, in various scenery spots, including Chongqing Jiefang Monument, Twin Towers, Great Hall of the People, Chaotianmen Bridge, Guotai Art Centre, and No. 4 Sun Yat-san Road.

Release
On May 14, 2018, the first official trailer for the film was released along with a teaser poster.

Happiness Is Coming was scheduled for release on 8 June 2018 in China.

References

External links
 
 
 

2018 films
Chinese comedy films
Films shot in Chongqing
Films set in Chongqing
2018 comedy films
2010s Mandarin-language films